Beverly Hills Vet is an American television program that deals with problematic pets and their eccentric owners. This show is hosted by Katrina Warren. It was shown on the channel Animal Planet.

References

External links

Animal Planet original programming
2003 American television series debuts
2003 American television series endings
Television series about animals